Robert Greenberg (born 1954) is an American composer, pianist, and musicologist.

Robert or Bob Greenberg may also refer to:
 Robert Greenberg (born 1940), Founder and CEO of Skechers
 Robert M. Greenberg of R/GA, see Academy Award for Best Visual Effects
 Bob Greenberg (1934–2009), American record executive
 Bob Greenberg (programmer), early Microsoft employee
 Bob Greenberg (writer), wrote Lobster Man from Mars